An archipelagic state is an island country that consists of an archipelago.  The designation is legally defined by the United Nations Convention on the Law of the Sea (UNCLOS). In various conferences, The Bahamas, Fiji, Indonesia, Papua New Guinea, and the Philippines are the five original sovereign states that obtained approval in the UNCLOS signed in Montego Bay, Jamaica on 10 December 1982 and qualified as the archipelagic states.

Archipelagic states are composed of groups of islands forming a state as a single unit, with the islands and the waters within the baselines as internal waters. Under this concept ("archipelagic doctrine"), an archipelago shall be regarded as a single unit, so that the waters around, between, and connecting the islands of the archipelago, irrespective of their breadth and dimensions, form part of the internal waters of the state, and are subject to its exclusive sovereignty. The baselines must enclose the main islands of the archipelago and the enclosed water to land ratio must be "between 1:1 and 9:1".

The approval of the United Nations (UN) for the five sovereign states as archipelagic states respect existing agreements with other countries and shall recognize traditional fishing rights and other legitimate activities of the immediately adjacent neighboring countries in certain areas falling within archipelagic waters. The terms and conditions for the exercise of such rights and activities, including the nature, the extent and the areas to which they apply, shall, at the request of any of the countries concerned, be regulated by bilateral agreements between them. Such rights shall not be transferred to or shared with third countries or their nationals.

As of 20 June 2015, a total of 22 sovereign states have sought to claim archipelagic status.

List of archipelagic states 
This is a list of the current archipelagic states in the world. These 22 island countries have sought to claim archipelagic status by utilising the 1982 UN Convention on the Law of the Sea provisions.

Bolded are the five original official archipelagic states.

See also

 List of archipelagos
 List of island countries
 Lists of islands
 Thalassocracy

Notes

References 

International law
Law of the sea
+
State